Olvera Street (also Calle Olvera or Placita Olvera, originally Calle de los Vignes, Vine Street, and Wine Street) is a historic street in downtown Los Angeles, and a part of El Pueblo de Los Angeles Historic Monument, the area immediately around the 19th-century Los Angeles Plaza, which has been the main square of the city since the early 1820s, when California was still part of Mexico, and was the center of community life until the town expanded in the 1870s. Many of the Plaza District's historic buildings are on Olvera Street, including its oldest one, the Avila Adobe, built in 1818; the Pelanconi House built in 1857; and the Sepulveda House built in 1887.

Restaurants, vendors, and public establishments are along the pedestrian mall, a block-long narrow, tree-shaded, brick-lined marketplace where some merchants are descended from the original vendors who opened shops when a then-decrepit Olvera Street was recreated as a tourist attraction in 1930, a romanticized version with the theme of a Mexican marketplace. The exterior facades of the brick buildings enclosing Olvera Street and on the small vendor stands lining its center are colorful piñatas, hanging puppets in white peasant garb, Mexican pottery, sarapes, mounted bull horns, and oversized sombreros. Olvera Street attracts almost two million visitors per year who can find, while not an authentic Mexican or Mexican-American market, an homage to the history and traditions of the pueblo's early settlers and the city's Mexican heritage.

Geography 

Olvera Street is in the northeast of modern-day Downtown Los Angeles, between Main and Alameda streets, running north from the Los Angeles Plaza to Cesar Chavez Avenue. It is part of El Pueblo de Los Ángeles Historical Monument, the area immediately around the Plaza. This is west of Union Station and southeast of Chinatown. Though Los Angeles was founded in 1781, this Plaza dates to the 1820s, and is approximately a block east and south of the original 18th-century Plaza.

History

Early days

Los Angeles was founded in 1781 by Spanish pobladores (settlers), on a site southeast of today's Olvera Street near the Los Angeles River. They consisted of 11 families—44 men, women, and children — and were accompanied by a few Spanish soldiers. They had come from nearby Mission San Gabriel Arcángel to establish a secular pueblo on the banks of the Porciúncula River at the Indian village of Yang-na. Of the 44 original pobladores [colonists] who founded Los Angeles, only two were white, […] Of the other 42, 26 had some degree of African ancestry and 16 were Indians or mestizos [people of mixed Spanish and Indian blood]. — William M. Mason, 1975 The new town was named El Pueblo de Nuestra Señora Reina de los Ángeles. Priests from San Gabriel established an asistencia (a sub-mission), the Nuestra Señora Reina de los Angeles Asistencia, to tend to their religious needs. The pueblo eventually built its own parish church, known today as the "Old Plaza Church." The original 18th-century plaza was approximately a block north and west of the present one. Unpredictable flooding forced the settlers to abandon the original site and move to higher ground in the early 1800s, with the current Plaza at the center of the newly moved pueblo.

Spanish colonial rule lasted until Mexican independence in 1821. This period saw Los Angeles's first streets and adobe buildings. During Mexican rule, which lasted twenty-six years, the Plaza was the heart of a vibrant ethnic Californio community life in Los Angeles and was the center of an economy based upon farming in the former flood plain, supplemented with cattle ranching.

The Pelanconi House was, in the second half of the 19th century, a winery producing wine from the grapes that grew there, and to this day still do. The DNA matches that of grapes at Mission San Gabriel, established in 1771.

After the Mexican War, the Plaza remained the center of town. A small alley branching off of the Plaza, Wine Street, had its name changed by City Council ordinance in 1877 to Olvera Street to honor Agustin Olvera, the first Superior Court Judge of Los Angeles County, who owned a no longer existing adobe house nearby. In the 1880s, the little town grew rapidly due to the influx of settlers from Southern States. These joined the Spaniards and earlier English-speaking settlers who had become voting citizens before 1846.

As the town expanded, the original area of settlement came to be neglected, and served as a neighborhood for new immigrants, especially Mexicans and Sicilians. It included a Chinese community, which eventually relocated to the present nearby Chinatown to make way for the construction of Union Station. During the 1920s, the pace of Mexican immigration increased rapidly. California was the primary destination, with Los Angeles being a common choice. As a part of a movement to preserve what was viewed as California's "authentic" heritage, Christine Sterling began a public campaign to renovate the Francisco Avila Adobe, which evolved into a campaign to remake Olvera street as a modern Mexican-style market place.

Preservation and restoration

Sterling's efforts to rescue the area began in 1926, when she learned of a plan to demolish the Avila Adobe, the oldest existing home in the city. After raising the issue with the Los Angeles Chamber of Commerce, Sterling approached Harry Chandler, the publisher of the Los Angeles Times, with a plan to create a Mexican marketplace and cultural center in the Plaza. Chandler was intrigued by the idea of packaging the Plaza area that acknowledged the Mexican heritage of the city while presenting a romanticized ersatz version, an ethnic theme park. He helped by providing extensive publicity and supporting the development plan in The Times.

However, by 1928, due to a lack of financial support for implementing her ideas, the project appeared to be doomed. In late November, Sterling discovered a Los Angeles City Health Department Notice of Condemnation posted in front of the Avila Adobe. In response, she posted her own hand-painted sign condemning the shortsightedness of city bureaucrats in failing to preserve an important historic site. Her act helped attract additional public interest in preserving the old adobe. The Los Angeles City Council finally reversed its original order of condemnation. Support for restoring the adobe rushed in from throughout the city. Building materials came from several local companies, including Blue Diamond Cement and the Simmons Brick Company, one of the largest employers of Mexicans in the Los Angeles area. Los Angeles Police Chief James Davis provided a crew of prison inmates to do hard labor on the project. Sterling oversaw the entire construction project, and an excerpt from her diary vividly captures her spirit and sense of desperation for financial support during the construction: "One of the prisoners is a good carpenter, another an electrician. Each night I pray they will arrest a bricklayer and a plumber."

In spite of ample supplies and forced volunteers, the project lacked solid financial backing until Chandler came forward with capital for the project through funds collected at $1,000-a-plate luncheons with selected businessmen. Chandler established and headed the Plaza de Los Angeles Corporation, a for-profit venture which became the financial basis for the restoration of Plaza-Olvera. The street was closed to traffic in 1929.

On Easter Sunday 1930, Sterling's romantic revival came to pass with the opening of Paseo de Los Angeles (which later became popularly known by its official street name Olvera Street). Touted as "A Mexican Street of Yesterday in a City of Today", Olvera Street was an instant success as a tourist site. La Opinión, a leading Spanish-language daily, praised the project as "una calleja que recuerda al México viejo" (a street which recalls old Mexico).

William M. Pizor produced a narrated  travelogue short film about the street in 1937 titled A Street of Memory. It is extant.

Events

Blessing of the Animals event
The Blessing of the Animals at Olvera Street, an event dating to 1930, is held every Sábado de Gloria (Holy Saturday, the Saturday before Easter). The event was originally held in conjunction with the Feast Day of Saint Anthony of the Desert, but it was changed to take advantage of better weather. The original procession has grown into an all-day event with vendors, performers, and a procession where participants bring their animals to be blessed by religious authorities and others.

The event is held near the Biscailuz Building and is represented by a mural on its exterior, The Blessing of the Animals, by Leo Politi.  The event is also the subject of a book by the same name.

Controversies 
Some find Olvera Street to be a sanitized fabrication of Latin American culture merely to attract tourists, a "fake" Mexican presence; since 1926, it has garnered controversy as historians and collectors have attempted to preserve the sites for historic study and educational purposes. In contrast, there are researchers that often cite that Olvera Street is an "appropriated" misnomer of Latin-American and Hispanic culture, and should therefore not remain as a source of tourism. Even critics though, have acknowledged how the city fathers were ready to condemn and destroy the area in the 1920s. The attention brought to the area shamed the city into saving its heritage and preserving some of the original adobe buildings. This tension around an idealized cultural image is evident in the mural América Tropical (full name: América Tropical: Oprimida y Destrozada por los Imperialismos, or Tropical America: Oppressed and Destroyed by Imperialism) by David Siqueiros which was slated to be an exciting addition to the street until it was actually unveiled in 1932. The Getty Conservation Institute began performing detailed conservation work on the mural in 2010 and the America Tropical Interpretive Center opened to provide public access in 2012.

Landmarks

Reception
The American Planning Association named Olvera Street one of the top five "Great Streets" in the United States for 2015.

In popular culture

 "Golondrina", an opera by Lindsey C. Harnsberger was composed in 2015 to a libretto by Robert Cartland. The opera, originally titled "Olvera Street," was premiered by Vineyard Touring Opera Company (VTO) in November 2017 in Los Angeles, Santa Monica, and South Pasadena, California. It was revised and retitled in 2017 for April and May performances by VTO in Glendale and South Pasadena, California. The story of the opera is based on Christine Sterling's fight to save the Avila Adobe and later restore Olvera Street.
 The plaza, before it was improved, can be seen in Charlie Chaplin's 1921 film The Kid, which featured a number of scenes of the west side of the plaza a few doors north of the Pelanconi House. At the time of the film, Olvera Street, then still called Wine Street, was seen as a dingy alley.

See also

Avila Adobe
La Iglesia de Nuestra Señora Reina de los Angeles
LA Plaza de Cultura y Artes
Pueblo de Los Angeles
Rancho Camulos
Rancho San Francisco
Zanja Madre
History of Los Angeles
List of Registered Historic Places in Los Angeles

References

External links 

Olvera Street Merchants Olvera Street
El Pueblo de Los Angeles Historical Monument. City of Los Angeles.
Guerrero, Diana L. Blessing of the Animals, 2007

Streets in Los Angeles
Pueblo de Los Ángeles
Downtown Los Angeles
History of Los Angeles
Mexican-American culture in Los Angeles
Pedestrian malls in the United States
Tourist attractions in Los Angeles